Dying to Live is the second studio album by American rapper Kodak Black. It was released on December 14, 2018, via Atlantic Records. It follows his Heart Break Kodak mixtape, released earlier in 2018, as well as his previous mixtape, Project Baby 2: All Grown Up, the deluxe edition of his mixtape Project Baby 2, released in 2017. The album features guest appearances from Lil Pump, Travis Scott, Offset and Juice Wrld.

Background
On November 25, 2018, Kodak Black announced via Twitter that he would be releasing his second studio album the following month. Black wrote on social media that "Yung Nigga Been Getting Money... I Did Everything The Streets Glorified #AlbumDropping Next Month." The album is Black's first following his release from jail in August.

On December 11, 2018, Kodak Black shared the album's tracklist.

Promotion
The album's lead single, "If I'm Lyin, I'm Flyin" was released on September 28, 2018, along with the music video.

The second single, "Zeze" featuring Travis Scott and Offset was released on October 12, 2018. The music video was released on November 23, 2018.

The third single, "Take One", was released on November 16, 2018, and the fourth single, "Calling My Spirit", was released on November 30, 2018. The music video for "Calling My Spirit" was released on December 5, 2018.

The first two promotional singles, "Testimony" and "MoshPit" featuring Juice Wrld was released on December 8, 2018, and December 12, 2018, respectively. The music video for "Testimony" was released on December 10, 2018.

Critical reception

Dying to Live received generally positive reviews from music critics.

HipHopDX said of the album, "Dying to Live" is an imperfect window into a troubled soul. At times, it's unclear whether Kodak is being honest or disingenuously begging for sympathy. Even if it's carefully executed and shows artistic growth, the album's mature subject matter is overshadowed by Kodak's alleged history."

Commercial performance
Dying to Live debuted at number one on the US Billboard 200 with 89,000 album-equivalent units (of which 5,000 were pure album sales). It is Kodak Black's first number-one album on the chart.

Track listing
Credits adapted from Tidal.

Notes
  signifies an uncredited co-producer
 "Zeze" is stylized in all caps

Sample credits
 "Malcolm X.X.X." contains a sample from "No One in the World", written by Kenneth Hirsch and Marti Sharron, as performed by Anita Baker.

Personnel
Credits adapted from Tidal.

Technical
 Derek "Dyryk" Garcia – mixing 
 Jacob Richards – mixing 
 Jaycen Joshua – mixing 
 Mike Seaberg – mixing 
 Rashawn McLean – mixing 
 Chris Athens – mastering 
 Chris Ulrich – engineering 
 Drew Drucker – engineering 
 Jamie Peters – engineering 
 Tyler Unland – engineering

Charts

Weekly charts

Year-end charts

Certifications

References

Kodak Black albums
Atlantic Records albums
2018 albums
Albums produced by Southside (record producer)
Albums produced by London on da Track
Albums produced by Jake One